2009 Legends Cup was the first edition of the Legends Cup, a tournament for senior retired players (35+). The teams invited to the tournament were Russia, Netherlands, France, Spain, Portugal and Italy.
The first edition of the Legends Cup, which took place from January 31 to February 1, 2009, in Moscow in the Ice Palace "Megasport".

All of the matches were held in the Khodynka Arena, Moscow, Russia.

Background
The organizer of the tournament which featured European stars was the sports agency NewSport. The tournament was held with the support of the Russian Football Union, the Government of Moscow and the State Duma of the Russian Federation. Accommodation and customer service – at the Marriott Grand Hotel, which was also the headquarters of the 2008 Champions League final in Moscow. All the games of the tournament took place in the Megasport Sport Palace on the Khodynka Field.

Regulations
The tournament was held in two stages: qualifying games in the subgroups and the final part, drawing places from 1 to 6. On the first day of the tournament on January 31 (Saturday) qualifying games were held in groups, each group consisted of three teams. Games in groups were held in a circular system, each team played 2 games.

The duration of one match was 40 minutes, two halves of 20 minutes, a break between halves – 10 minutes. The game was conducted according to the 6-a side scheme: 5 in the field + goalkeeper. The size of the ball is No. 5. The size of the platform is 48 × 24 meters, the size of the gate is 5 × 2 meters.

For the victory, 3 points were awarded, a draw – 1, a defeat – 0. In case of equality of points, two or more teams took into account the following indicators: the results of matches among themselves, the number of wins, the difference of goals scored and conceded, more goals scored. In case of equality of all these indicators – by lot.

On the second day of the tournament, on February 1 (Sunday), the games of the final stage took place. The teams that took the 3rd place in the groups played 5-6 places. Teams that took the 2nd place in the groups, played 3-4 places. The teams that took the first place in the groups played in the finals.

Determination of the winner in the games of the final stage with equal score occurred through a series of post-match penalties – five hits from each team, with a draw result – further to the first miss.

Squads
Italy: Marco Ballotta, Amedeo Carboni, Lorenzo Amoruso, Demetrio Albertini, Maurizio Ganz, Dario Marcolin, Angelo Carbone, Alessandro Romano, Diego Bonavina

France: Guillaume Warmuz, Christian Karembeu, William Ayache, Patrice Loko, Martin Djetou, Jean-Pierre Cyprien, Jean-Marc Chanelet

Spain: Toni Jiménez, Jon Andoni Goikoetxea, Guillermo Amor, José Amavisca, Ángel Cuéllar, Cristóbal Parralo, Enrique Romero, Julen Guerrero, Fran, Paco Jémez

Portugal: Neno, Paulo Futre, João Pinto, Jorge Costa, Sá Pinto, José Dominguez, Hugo Porfírio, Oceano da Cruz, Hélder, Carlos Xavier, Dimas, Fernando Gomes

Netherlands: Ronald de Boer, Pierre van Hooijdonk, Richard Witschge, Danny Muller, Frank Verlaat, Regi Blinker, Peter Hoekstra, Bert Konterman

Russia: Aleksandr Filimonov, Viktor Onopko, Yuriy Nikiforov, Dmitri Popov, Dmitri Ananko, Akhrik Tsveiba, Dmitri Alenichev, Valeri Karpin, Igor Simutenkov, Konstantin Yeryomenko, Sergei Yuran, Igor Korneev, Dmitry Kuznetsov, Sergei Kiriakov

Famous football players and coaches were invited to the tournament as guests, such as Eusébio, Franco Baresi, Fabio Capello, Oliver Kahn, Michael Rummenigge, Rinat Dasayev and other European football legends.

Results

Standings

Group A

Group B

Matches defining places

3-4 places match

5-6 places match

Final

Top scorers
 Pierre van Hooijdonk,  Sá Pinto,  Maurizio Ganz – 9 goals each

 José Amavisca,  Dmitri Alenichev,  Sergei Yuran – 5 goals each

External links
Legends Cup official site

Legends Cup (Russia)
Legends
Legends